Rob Friedman (born 1950) is an American media executive.

He was the Co-Chairman of Lionsgate Motion Picture Group, overseeing all aspects of Lionsgate’s domestic and international feature film acquisition, production and distribution as well as the home entertainment releases of theatrical feature films. He stepped down in 2016. Friedman joined Lionsgate in January 2012 following the company’s acquisition of the worldwide filmed entertainment studio Summit Entertainment  where he served as the Co-Chairman and CEO since 2007.

Friedman started his career in 1970 in the mailroom at Warner Bros. Studios and in the subsequent 27 years he held many posts ultimately rising to become the studio's President of Worldwide Advertising and Publicity.

In 1997, Friedman moved to Paramount Pictures as Vice Chairman of the Paramount Motion Pictures Group.  In 2000, he also added the role Chief Operating Officer, ultimately overseeing seven divisions.  He created the studio's specialty film division then known as Paramount Classics.  Friedman also served on the Board of Directors of UIP, the joint international distribution venture between Paramount and Universal Studios, and Movie Link, one of the internet's first legal film download to view sites.

In 2017, Friedman joined Tang Media Partners as CEO and chairman of TMP Entertainment. TMP's entertainment holdings merged to become Global Road Entertainment and Friedman became Chairman and CEO of the Global Road Entertainment studio. He left these positions in November 2018.

He is a member of the Wilshire Boulevard Temple. He was a prominent supporter of Hillary Clinton in her 2016 presidential campaign.

Professional honors and awards
In November 2010, Friedman was named the Ernst & Young Entrepreneur Of The Year in the Media, Entertainment and Communications category for his work in creating Summit.  Friedman is on the Board of Directors of the Will Rogers Motion Picture Pioneers Foundation  and a supporter of the Special Olympics movement, having served on the Special Olympics Southern California Board (SOSC) as well as the international Board of Directors for the 2009 Special Olympics World Winter Games.   In addition, Friedman is a Founding Member of the 2015 Special Olympics World Summer Games Organizing Committee for which he currently serves as Chairman of the Board and played a role in bringing the 2015 World Games to Los Angeles.   In 2011, Friedman was selected by SOSC as the Honoree at the 15th annual Pier Del Sol.   Friedman is also a member of the Board of Governors of the Academy of Motion Pictures Arts & Sciences.

References 

Living people
American entertainment industry businesspeople
20th-century American Jews
American chief operating officers
1950 births
21st-century American Jews